The  is a railway line in Kanagawa Prefecture, Japan, operated by the private railway operator Sagami Railway (Sotetsu).

Services
Services on the Main Line are divided into four categories.
Local (各停) - services stop at all stations. They do not travel from end to end; services are split at Futamatagawa, with trains running between Yokohama and Futamatagawa and between Futamatagawa and either Ebina or Shōnandai.
Rapid (快速) - services stop between Yokohama and Futamatagawa at Hoshikawa, Nishiya and Tsurugamine, and at all stations from Futamatagawa to either Ebina or Shōnandai.
Express (急行) - services run non-stop between Yokohama and Futamatagawa, and stop at all stations west of Futamatagawa to Ebina.
Commuter Express (通勤急行 or 通急) - services stop between Yokohama and Futamatagawa at Nishiya and Tsurugamine, and at all stations from Futamatagawa to either Ebina or Shōnandai.
Commuter Limited Express (通勤特急 or 通特) services stop between Yokohama and Futamatagawa  at Nishiya and Tsurugamine, and at Yamato or Izumino from Futamatagawa to either Ebina or Shōnandai.
Limited Express (特急) services stop between Yokohama and Ebina at Nishiya, Futamatagawa and Yamato.

Stations
Local trains and JR Direct Local trains stop at all stations; for all other train types, trains stop at stations marked ●, pass stations marked | . 
Commuter Express and Commuter Limited Express trains stop at station marked ▲ .
 R: Rapid
 E: Express
 L: Limited Express
 JR: Limited Express service via Saikyō Line

Rolling stock
 8000 series
 9000 series
 10000 series
 11000 series
 12000 series
 20000 series
 21000 series
 JR East E233-7000 series

 Tokyu 3000 series
 Tokyu 5050-4000 series
 Tokyu 5080 series

Non-revenue-earning stock
 2000 series
 ED10 electric locomotives

History

Work to electrify the line commenced in June 1942, with the entire line between Yokohama and Ebina electrified by 20 September 1944.

Work to double-track the line commenced in January 1957 between Yokohama and Nishi-Yokohama. The entire line was double-tracked by March 1974.

The first air-conditioned trains (4-car 6000 series EMUs) were introduced on the line on 3 July 1971.

10-car trains started operating on the line from 6 April 1981.

Station ticket barriers were modified to allow use of the Passnet magnetic farecard from 1 October 2000.

There was a short spur line which branched from Sagamino Station to the Naval Air Facility Atsugi air base. While the track remains in place up to the fence of the base, the line is no longer in use.

In order to improve safety and efficiency, a  section around Tsurugamine Station is being transitioned to an underground structure. The underground track section and new station building is expected to be completed in 2034.

March 2023 timetable revision 

The Sotetsu Shin-Yokohama Line connects Nishiya to Hazawa Yokohama-Kokudai,  and further to the Tōkyū Shin-Yokohama Line. Through service to the Saikyō Line began on 30 November 2019 while services to the Tōkyū Shin-Yokohama Line began on 18 March 2023.

With the opening of this new line, Limited Express and Rapid services make a stop at Nishiya, which facilitates transfer between services to central Yokohama and the Tokyo Metropolis.

In addition, two new service types will be implemented. They are the Commuter Limited Express (通勤特急) and Commuter Express (通勤急行) services, which both operate through services from / to the Izumino Line. The former service will replace the current Express on the Izumino Line, and will make additional stops at Nishiya and Tsurugamine. The latter service is a brand new service, making stops at all stations west of Nishiya.

References

Lines of Sagami Railway
Railway lines in Kanagawa Prefecture
1067 mm gauge railways in Japan
Railway lines opened in 1926
1926 establishments in Japan